Dillard & Clark was a country rock duo which featured ex-Byrds member Gene Clark and bluegrass banjo player Doug Dillard.

History
The group was formed in 1968, shortly after Clark departed the Byrds and Dillard left the Dillards. It was considered part of the Southern California country-rock scene in the late 1960s, along with Poco, the Flying Burrito Brothers, Linda Ronstadt, Michael Nesmith and the First National Band, Rick Nelson & The Stone Canyon Band, and the latter-day Byrds.

Its first album The Fantastic Expedition of Dillard & Clark was released in 1968 on A&M. Recording personnel included Clark (lead vocals, acoustic guitar, harmonica), Dillard (banjo, fiddle, guitar), Bernie Leadon (vocals, lead guitar, bass, banjo), David Jackson (bass), Don Beck (mandolin, resonator guitar), with guests Chris Hillman (mandolin), Byron Berline (fiddle), and Andy Belling (harpsichord). Most of the songs were written by Clark, Dillard, and Leadon. Drummer Michael Clarke assisted with a few early live performances.

The album is praised by connoisseurs for its iconic quality and innovative character, at the intersection of country rock and americana.

The band's only other album, Through the Morning, Through the Night, was released in 1969. Donna Washburn (guitar, vocals) joined the group, and Bernie Leadon departed to co-found the Eagles (in 1971). The new lineup included Clark, Dillard, Washburn (guitar/vocals), Berline, Jackson, and Jon Corneal (drums). Leadon, Hillman, and Sneaky Pete Kleinow (pedal steel guitar) made guest appearances.

When the band split up Gene Clark resumed a solo career. Dillard kept performing as Doug Dillard & The Expedition for a short time, but soon pursued his own solo career. Byron Berline went on to form the Country Gazette with guitarist/bassist Roger Bush.

Discography

Albums

Singles
 1968: "Train Leaves Here This Mornin'" / "Out On The Side" (A&M)
 1969: "Why Not Your Baby" / "The Radio Song" (A&M)
 1969: "Don't Be Cruel" / "Lyin' Down The Middle" (A&M)
 1970: "Don't Let Me Down" / "Rocky Top" (A&M)
 2012:  "Why Not Your Baby" / "Lyin' Down The Middle" (A&M / Sundazed)

Compilations
 1970: Grass Roots (A&M) compiles songs by the Flying Burrito Brothers and Dillard & Clark
 1973: Kansas City Southern (A&M) Netherlands release
 1975: G & D (A&M) Netherlands release
 1989: The Fantastic Expedition Of Dillard & Clark & Through The Morning Through The Night (A&M) compilation of both albums

References

External links
 
 

American country rock groups
Musical groups established in 1968
Musical groups disestablished in 1969
A&M Records artists
Rock music duos